Juraj Baláž (born 12 June 1980) is a Slovak footballer.

Career

Club
In July 2009, he joined Polonia Bytom on a three-year contract. He left the club on 7 January 2013.

References

External links
 
 

1980 births
Living people
Sportspeople from Nitra
Slovak footballers
Association football goalkeepers
Polonia Bytom players
FC Nitra players
FC Senec players
FC Spartak Trnava players
1. FC Tatran Prešov players
FK Železiarne Podbrezová players
Slovak Super Liga players
Expatriate footballers in Poland
Slovak expatriate sportspeople in Poland
FC Silon Táborsko players
Slovak expatriate footballers